Ryan Robinson (born December 9, 1990) is a former American football defensive end. He played college football at Oklahoma State.

Early years
He played high school football at Mill Creek High School.

Professional career

Oakland Raiders
He was first signed by the Oakland Raiders as an undrafted free agent in 2013.

Seattle Seahawks

He was signed by the Seattle Seahawks, but waived on June 15, 2015 after rupturing his Achilles tendon in off season team activities. On September 3, 2016, he was released by the Seahawks as part of final roster cuts.

References

External links
Oakland Raiders bio
Oklahoma State Cowboys bio

1990 births
Living people
American football defensive ends
Oklahoma State Cowboys football players
Oakland Raiders players
Seattle Seahawks players